The 1921 British Mount Everest reconnaissance expedition set off to explore how it might be possible to get to the vicinity of Mount Everest, to reconnoitre possible routes for ascending the mountain, and – if possible – make the first ascent of the highest mountain in the world. At that time Nepal was closed to foreigners, so any approach had to be from the north, through Tibet. A feasible route was discovered from the east up the Kharta Glacier and then crossing the Lhakpa La pass north east of Everest. It was then necessary to descend to the East Rongbuk Glacier before climbing again to Everest's North Col. However, although the North Col was reached, it was not possible to climb further before the expedition had to withdraw.

Initially the expedition explored from the north and discovered the main Rongbuk Glacier, only to find that it seemed to provide no likely routes to the summit. However, at the time it was not realised that the East Rongbuk glacier actually flowed into the Rongbuk glacier – it was thought it descended away to the east.

As a reconnaissance the expedition was a success because it determined that a good route might be to approach the East Rongbuk glacier via the Rongbuk glacier, and then follow the North Col route to the summit. Next year the 1922 British Mount Everest expedition took this route and was able to climb above the North Col, although it did not reach the summit.

Charles Howard-Bury led the 1921 expedition and George Mallory, who had never before been to Himalaya, was included in the team. As events were to turn out, Mallory became the de facto lead climber. Howard-Bury wrote a book about the expedition, Mount Everest, the Reconnaissance, 1921, to which Mallory contributed six of the chapters.

Background

In 1856 the Great Trigonometric Survey was able to calculate that the highest peak in the world was not Kangchenjunga, but the somewhat unnoticed Peak XV, measured to be 29,002 feet high. Mountaineering was in its infancy but antagonism and apathy towards it were waning so, by 1907, to celebrate the fiftieth anniversary of the Alpine Club, a definite plan was hatched for a British reconnaissance of Everest. General Charles Bruce, who later on became the president of the club, was chosen to lead the expedition. Entry to Tibet, which had historically refused entry to foreigners, became possible due to Sir Francis Younghusband's imperial and exploratory activities, which culminated in his "Mission to Lhasa" and subsequent 1904 Treaty of Lhasa. Initially, the British Secretary of State for India, Lord Morley, refused permission for an expedition out of "consideration of high Imperial policy". This political delay and World War I, in John Buchan's words, "put an end to these pleasant fancies".

By 1920 the Secretary of State had given approval for an expedition so Colonel Charles Howard-Bury was sent on a diplomatic mission which persuaded the Viceroy of India, Lord Reading, to support that idea. Because Nepal was closed to entry at the time, the expedition's planned approach march would be through Sikkim. The viceroy's agent there, Sir Charles Bell, had been working in Lhasa and he had formed a good relationship with the Dalai Lama, who granted an entry pass for the expedition.

In January 1921 the Alpine Club and the Royal Geographical Society (of which Younghusband was now President) jointly set up the Mount Everest Committee to co-ordinate and fund the expedition. Although they initially supported an all-out attempt at the summit, members of the committee eventually agreed that the primary purpose of the mission should be reconnaissance.

The expedition team and the march in

Bruce's military duties prevented him from participating so Howard-Bury was chosen as leader. It was a reconnaissance expedition and at the time  was the closest any explorer had been to the mountain. The expedition set off in April 1921 – the climbing team consisted of two experienced mountaineers, Harold Raeburn and Alexander Kellas, and two younger men, George Mallory and Guy Bullock, both Old Wykehamists without any Himalayan experience. The expedition team also included Sandy Wollaston, a naturalist and doctor, Alexander Heron, a geologist, Henry Morshead (also an Old Wykehamist) and Oliver Wheeler, surveyors seconded from the army. When George Bernard Shaw saw a photograph (above) of them wearing Norfolk jackets, knickerbockers, puttees and tweeds he quipped that they "looked like a Connemara picnic trapped in a snowstorm".

The expedition, having gathered Sherpas, Bhutias, porters, supplies and 100 Army mules (which later had to be replaced with hill mules and yaks), set off from Darjeeling in British India on 18 May 1921 for the  march to Everest. During their march, the climate changed from hot and humid with verdant growth and heavy, frequent rain, to cold, dry and very windy. Then, leaving the Lhasa road and taking a westward course, the expedition reached Khamba Dzong. Here, on 6 June, Kellas died suddenly of heart failure and Raeburn became sick and had to return to Sikkim. The party followed the valley of the Arun River to the west and at Shiling were first able to see Everest well enough to begin to gauge its topography. Travelling on through Shekar Dzong they reached Tingri Dzong which became the base for the northern phase of their explorations. By that time, Mallory and Howard-Bury had taken a dislike to each other with Mallory writing that Howard-Bury was "too much the landlord with not only Tory prejudices, but a highly developed sense of hate and contempt for other sorts of people than his own."

Northern reconnaissance

From Tingri, several valleys could be followed south towards Everest and on 23 June Mallory and Bullock started off to the south with sixteen Sherpas and porters. Two days later, at Chobuk they reached the foot of the Rongbuk valley and were then able to see Everest. Only familiar with Alpine glaciers, they had difficulty negotiating  seracs and retired back at  where the West Rongbuk Glacier debouches. Note: the glaciers have lowered and retreated considerably since that time.

Rongbuk Glacier

On 1 July Mallory with five Sherpas went towards the head of the glacier near the North Face of Everest and at  he was able to evaluate the western side of the North Col. There seemed to be no satisfactory way to reach the North Col but above there, and towards the summit, there seemed to be a feasible route. Everest's west ridge also did not seem encouraging from this location so Mallory decided the West Rongbuk glacier should be explored.

West Rongbuk Glacier

The topography to the west is very complex so on 5 July Mallory and Bullock climbed the  Ri Ring to get a better perspective. They were able to examine the upper North Face and the north ridge above the North Col and considered the latter was manageable. However, they formed a wrong impression that a high ridge ran from Everest's North Peak stretching away east to the Arun river. They therefore thought that any approach to the eastern side of the North Col could not be from Rongbuk, never imagining that the glacier on the other side of the North Col would turn back into the main Rongbuk glacier. In fact, where it joins, just above the Rongbuk Monastery, only a small stream is to be seen. Looking more to the west, two routes to Everest looked promising, one over the Lho La at the head of the Rongbuk glacier and one over an unnamed col between Pumori and Lingtren – the hope was that a valley to the south of these cols might provide a good route to the summit. Mallory climbed a peak he called the "Island Peak" (Lingtrennup) from where he attempted to photograph Changtse, Everest and Lhotse, which was just visible. They eventually reached the unnamed col by going west up what is now known as the Pumori Glacier and so by 19 July were able to look down into the Western Cwm and the Khumbu Glacier. They were not able to see the South Col but they thought the Khumbu glacier looked "terribly steep and broken" and anyway the  drop from their col to the glacier was a "hopeless precipice". Any approach through the Western Cwm would therefore have to be from Nepal and by a different expedition.

Camps were struck on 20 July with no route having been selected but there remained the possibility of reaching the North Col from the east. Before heading that way, Mallory and Bullock started to investigate the place where, unknown to them, the East Rongbuk glacier debouches. They had to curtail their exploration here because bad news came that the photographs Mallory had taken were all useless because he had been putting the photographic plates in back to front. Photographs were vital as part of the reconnaissance so for two days Mallory and Bullock raced around retaking as many as possible. On this occasion Mallory re-took his photographs from "Island Peak" and Bullock actually reached the Lho La and was able to photograph the Khumbu Icefall. On 25 July they rejoined Howard-Bury's party at Chobuk.

Morshead and Wheeler's surveys and other work

During this time Morshead and Wheeler had surveyed  of difficult unknown territory producing a map of four miles to an inch (1:250,000) and updating the map of Sikkim. Wheeler made a careful  photographic survey close to Everest itself producing a one-inch (1:63360) map.
Reports of these activities appeared in Howard-Bury's book along with a description of the scientific equipment and cameras that were used. Wheeler, Heron and Howard-Bury reached Nangpa La west of Everest and on the Nepalese border. Morshead and Wollaston crossed the border further west at Lapche, south of Lapche La (Labuche La), and got as far west as Nyenyam. The geographical and geological surveying reached as far north as the Tsangpo river.

Howard-Bury had been exploring to the east to find a location for a future base camp. Unable to cross a tributary of the Arun, he had come to the district of Kharta where no one knew anything about where their local river came from. Since it was glacial, Howard-Bury presumed it came from Everest and so would be a good place for an eastern base camp, if one was to be necessary. Howard-Bury then returned west for further exploration and to organise the removal of the whole expedition to Kharta on 29 July.

Eastern reconnaissance

Kharta valley to Kama valley

Suspecting the river at Kharta flowed from the North Col, Mallory and Bullock set off upstream on 2 August. The next day local inhabitants told them a different river flowed from Chomolungma. So they crossed a  pass to reach the valley of the Kama River which runs parallel but to the south. They were now very close to Makalu which was further south again. Ahead of them to the west they could see Lhotse and Everest as they approached the Kangshung Glacier and the Kangshung Face. Surrounded by three of the highest peaks in the world Mallory wrote of the Kama valley, "For me the most magnificent and sublime mountain scenery can be made lovelier by some more tender touch; and that too is added here". They regarded scaling the Kangshung Face as impossible, with Mallory noting, "Other men, less wise, might attempt this way if they would, but, emphatically, it was not for us."

They realised that they would have to return to the Kharta valley and to achieve this they climbed the  Kartse on 7 August so they could examine the North Col as well as the Kangshung Face. They wondered if the glacier in the valley to the north was the one that came down from the North Col or whether that glacier was further north again. Everest's northeast ridge they judged very difficult. The North Col and the north ridge above it were the only possibility left. They descended Kartse to Kama and returned to the Kharta valley.

Return to Kharta valley
Mallory was taken ill and so it was left to Bullock to head on west to the head of the Kharta glacier on 13 August. However, a runner came back very soon to tell Mallory that Bullock had observed that the glacier ended in a high pass ahead. He would explore further but it was looking as if the glacier from the North Col did not flow east. Bullock returned and Howard-Bury received a letter from Wheeler showing the results of his survey – the glacier flowing down the east side of the North Col turned sharply north and joined the main Rongbuk Glacier. Time was too short to return to Rongbuk, which now seemed clearly the best way to the North Col, so they decided the best thing to do was to prospect a route to the pass Bullock had seen, which they called Lhakpa La ("Windy Gap") to see whether the North Col could be reached in this way. The weather was bad and the glacier was treacherous but eventually they reached the  Lhakpa La on 18 August. Mallory decided the route was feasible and so it was agreed the reconnaissance could be concluded. They returned to base camp for ten days' rest.

North Col

The plan was for camp III on the Lhakpa La, IV on the North Col and one more camp before the summit although, as it turned out, this was to seriously underestimate the difficulties. They had to wait for a month for the monsoon to end and on 31 August all the team tentatively moved to advance base camp with Raeburn, who had unexpectedly returned, able to join them.

They had to stay at advance base camp until 20 September for the weather to improve and then Mallory, Bullock, Morshead and Wheeler set off for and reached Lhakpa La. It was now recognised that the North Col could not be reached without an intermediate camp so they returned to camp II for further supplies so that all the team (except Raeburn) along with twenty-six Sherpas could set off again for camp III. Next morning Mallory, Bullock, Wheeler and three Sherpas went down to the East Rongbuk glacier while the rest of the party turned back. After a very difficult night on the glacier in cold and windy conditions, the following day, 24 September, saw the party reach the North Col although without carrying loads. The terrain on the Col was good for a camp but the wind was extreme and no progress would be possible. Also, the gales were getting worse. On 25 September the party was forced to climb again to the Lhakpa La and on 26 September the entire expedition struck all the upper camps, returned to Kharta, and eventually reached Darjeeling on 25 October without mishap.

Howard-Bury was awarded the 1922 Founder's Medal of the Royal Geographical Society for his leadership of the expedition.

Subsequent events

Before the expedition had left Tibet, the Mount Everest Committee met and decided that a full assault should be made on the mountain in 1922 with General Bruce as leader. The Rongbuk – East Rongbuk – North Col route would be followed but on this occasion oxygen cylinders would be taken for the climbers. The 1921 expedition was regarded as successful by experts as well as the general public with large numbers of people turning up for the official welcome home by the Royal Geographical Society and the Alpine Club at the Queen's Hall in London. Howard-Bury had become a celebrity. Speaking of the future summit attempt in his Queen's Hall address Mallory said he was "very far from a sanguine estimate of success ...  A party or two arriving the top, each so tired that it was beyond helping the other, might provide good copy for the Press but the performance would provoke the censure of reasonable opinion".

Mallory had hoped to give up schoolteaching and to become a mountaineer and writer. When he provided his chapters for Howard-Bury's 1922 book of the expedition it had been on the clear understanding he would be paid. However, in 1923, three months before departing on the 1924 Everest expedition, he had still not received payment. When he pressed the Committee they rescinded their agreement and said he would not be paid but nevertheless they "fully appreciated the value of your contributions". The 1924 expedition was the one from which he would not return, the identity of his remains being discovered in 1999. Bullock's expedition diary was published in 1962.

Notes

Footnotes

Romanisations
Romanization of place names is very variable so this list is merely to relate those used in Howard-Bury's book to alternative romanisation.

References

Citations

Works cited

External links

 Selection of images from RGS exhibition

1921
British Mount Everest reconnaissance expedition, 1921
Expeditions from the United Kingdom